Geraldo dos Santos Júnior commonly known as Gelson (born January 10, 1979) is a former Brazilian footballer.

Club career
He joined Aboomoslem in 2010 but could not help them to stay in the top division.

 Assist Goals

References

1979 births
Living people
Brazilian footballers
Coritiba Foot Ball Club players
FC Shinnik Yaroslavl players
Russian Premier League players
Brazilian expatriate footballers
Expatriate footballers in Russia
Malmö FF players
Associação Académica de Coimbra – O.A.F. players
Veria F.C. players
Footballers from Curitiba
Expatriate footballers in Iran
F.C. Aboomoslem players
Shahrdari Tabriz players

Association football forwards